Arthur Bailey (1903-1979) was a British architect known for his work on churches and their reconstruction after World War II. He formed a partnership with William Henry Ansell.

His work includes:
Restoration of Dutch Church, Austin Friars, London
Restoration of St George's in the East, London
Holy Trinity, Twydall, Medway

References

English architects
1903 births
1979 deaths